The 1987 Tournament Players Championship was a golf tournament in Florida on the PGA Tour, held  at TPC Sawgrass in Ponte Vedra Beach, southeast of Jacksonville. It was the fourteenth Tournament Players Championship. 

Sandy Lyle of Scotland defeated Jeff Sluman on the third hole of a sudden-death playoff to become the first international player to win the title. Rains had softened the course and led to favorable scoring; the 36-hole cut of 143 (−1) was the lowest until 1993.

At the second playoff hole, the par-3 17th "Island Green," an unruly spectator jumped into the water as Sluman was addressing his  birdie putt for the win. After order was restored, he missed and they went to third extra hole at 18. Both found the fairway with their tee shots but both approaches went deep.

This was the second playoff at the Tournament Players Championship, but the first at the Stadium Course. This year also marked the championship's first seven-figure purse and its last with "Tournament" in the title.

Defending champion John Mahaffey finished ten strokes back, in a tie for 32nd place.

Venue

Eligibility requirements 
1. Top 126 players, if PGA Tour members, from Final 1986 Official Money List:

Greg Norman, Bob Tway, Payne Stewart,  Andy Bean, Dan Pohl, Hal Sutton, Tom Kite, Ben Crenshaw, Raymond Floyd, Bernhard Langer, John Mahaffey, Calvin Peete, Fuzzy Zoeller, Joey Sindelar, Jim Thorpe, Ken Green, Larry Mize, Doug Tewell, Corey Pavin, Tom Watson, Mike Hulbert, Don Pooley, Lanny Wadkins, Kenny Knox, Mark Wiebe, John Cook, Donnie Hammond, Paul Azinger, Mark O'Meara, Tim Simpson, Curtis Strange, Bobby Wadkins, Jack Nicklaus, Nick Price, Scott Hoch, Tom Purtzer, Chip Beck, Roger Maltbie, Scott Simpson, Gene Sauers, Phil Blackmar, Clarence Rose, Jay Haas, David Frost, Bruce Lietzke, Jodie Mudd, Bob Murphy, Gary Koch, Steve Pate, Willie Wood, Craig Stadler, Dan Forsman, D. A. Weibring, Ronnie Black, Howard Twitty, Mark Calcavecchia, Wayne Levi, Jeff Sluman, Rick Fehr, J. C. Snead, Sandy Lyle, Pat McGowan, Mike Reid, Danny Edwards, Ernie Gonzalez, Larry Nelson, Dave Barr, David Edwards, Bill Glasson, Hubert Green, Mark Hayes, Brian Claar, Fred Couples, Davis Love III, Peter Jacobsen, Lennie Clements, Mark McCumber, Jim Colbert, Mike Donald, Morris Hatalsky, Bob Gilder, Lon Hinkle, Bobby Clampett, David Graham, Brett Upper, Brad Faxon, Buddy Gardner, Russ Cochran, Tom Byrum, Blaine McCallister, Bobby Cole, Charlie Bolling, TC Chen, Lee Trevino, Bob Lohr, Jack Renner, Dan Halldorson, Leonard Thompson, Dave Rummells, George Archer, Barry Jaeckel, Larry Rinker, Jim Gallagher Jr., Curt Byrum, Dick Mast, Ken Brown, Mark Lye, George Burns, David Ogrin, Chris Perry, Fred Wadsworth, Andy Dillard, Bob Eastwood, Johnny Miller, Ed Fiori, Andrew Magee, Gary Hallberg, Mark Pfeil, Jay Delsing, John Adams, Tom Sieckmann, Antonio Cerda, Jr.

Source:

 Mac O'Grady,  Gil Morgan, Mike Sullivan, and Tony Sills elected not to play

2. Designated players

Andy North

3. Any foreign player meeting the requirements of a designated player, whether or not he is a PGA Tour member

Seve Ballesteros

4. Winners in the last 10 calendar years of the Tournament Players Championship, PGA Championship, U.S. Open, Masters Tournament and World Series of Golf

Hale Irwin, Bill Rogers

5. The leader in Senior PGA Tour official earnings of 1986

 Bruce Crampton elected not to play

Source:

6. The three players, not otherwise eligible, designated by the TPC Committee as "special selections"

Rodger Davis, Dave Stockton

7. To complete a field of 144 players, those players in order, not otherwise eligible, from the 1987 Official Money List, as of the completion of the USF&G Classic, March 22, 1987

Isao Aoki, Keith Clearwater, Steve Elkington, Sam Randolph, Brad Fabel, Bill Sander, Tsuneyuki Nakajima, Steve Jones, Rick Dalpos, Rocco Mediate, Jay Don Blake, John Inman, Mark Brooks, Denis Watson, Richard Zokol, Mike Nicolette

Source:

General source:

Round summaries

First round
Thursday, March 26, 1987
Friday, March 27, 1987

Source:

Second round
Friday, March 27, 1987
Saturday, March 28, 1987

Source:

Third round
Saturday, March 28, 1987

Source:

Final round
Sunday, March 29, 1987

On the 72nd hole, Lyle and Sluman both made birdie putts to finish at 274 (−14) and advanced to the playoff.

Playoff

The sudden-death playoff began on hole 16, went to 17, and ended at 18.

Scorecard

Source:

References

External links
The Players Championship website

1987
1987 in golf
1987 in American sports
1987 in sports in Florida
March 1987 sports events in the United States